Happiness Was Free is the 1976 album by the pioneer British Folk musician Wizz Jones. The standout tracks are "Propinquity", "Happiness Was Free", "Womankind" and "City of the Angels".

Track listing
"Propinquity"  (Michael Nesmith)
"Country Comfort"  (Bernie Taupin, Elton John)
"Happiness Was Free"  (Wizz Jones)
"Nathaniel"  (Wizz Jones)
"Man with the Banjo"  (Wizz Jones)
"Common or Garden Mystery"  (Wizz Jones)
"Black Dog"  (Jesse Winchester)
"Womankind"  (Robin Williamson)
"Living Outside the Law"  (Wizz Jones)
"City of the Angels"  (Alan Tunbridge)

Personnel
Wizz Jones - guitar, vocals
Peter Berryman - guitar
Sandy Spencer - cello
Rod Clements - bass

Production
Producer: Carsten Linde and Wizz Jones
Recording Engineer: Conny Plank
Mixing: Conny Plank
Photography: Carsten Linde

Wizz Jones albums
1976 albums
Intercord albums